Murrell may refer to:

Surname
 Adrian Murrell (born 1970), American football player
 Bryan Murrell (born 1955), English former rugby league footballer
 Chris Murrell (1956–2017), American jazz and gospel singer
Christine Mary Murrell (1874–1933), English medical doctor
 Frank Murrell (1874–1931), British businessman and politician
 Helen Murrell, Australian lawyer, judge and Chief Justice of the Supreme Court of the Australian Capital Territory (2013–2022)
 Hilda Murrell (1906–1984), English naturalist and campaigner against nuclear energy
 Ivan Murrell (1943–2006), American baseball player
 Jack Murrell (1901–1980), Australian rules footballer
 Jaime Murrell (born 1949), Panamanian musician
 Janie and Jerry Murrell, cofounders of the Five Guys American fast food chain
 James Murrell (c. 1785–1860), English cunning man (professional folk magician)
 Joe Murrell (1879–1952), English cricketer
 John Murrell (bandit) (1806–1844), American river bandit
 John Murrell (chemist) (1932–2016), British theoretical chemist
 John Murrell (playwright) (1945–2019), American-born Canadian playwright
 Jordan Murrell (born 1993), Canadian soccer player
 Marques Murrell (born 1985), American football player
 Red Murrell (1921–2001), American western swing musician
 Red Murrell (basketball) (1933–2017), American basketball player
 Scott Murrell (born 1985), English rugby league player
 Sharon Murrell (born 1946), Canadian politician
 William Murrell (physician), English physician, clinical pharmacologist and toxicologist
 William Murrell (politician, died 1892), American state legislator
 William Murrell Jr. (1845–1932), American state legislator
 Willie Murrell (1941–2018), American basketball player

Given name
 Murrell Hogue (1904–1990), American football player
 Murrell Smith Jr. (born 1968), American politician

See also
 Murrells, a surname
 Murrill, a surname

English-language masculine given names